The Pleasure Seekers is a lost 1920 American silent drama film produced by Selznick Pictures and distributed by the Select Company. It was directed by George Archainbaud and stars Elaine Hammerstein.

Plot
As summarized by a film publication, Craig Winchell (Campbell) is threatened with disownment by his wealthy father John Winchell (Currier) unless he gives up his wild ways, and particularly Mrs. Clara Marshall (Clayton), a divorcee with a rather tarnished reputation. Craig, determined to follow his father's wishes, leaves for a long motor trip. His automobile breaks down outside the home of Reverend Snowden (Furey) in a small town. There he meets Snowden's secretary, Mary Murdock (Hammerstein), and falls in love with her. The death of Snowden permits Mary to leave, and she and Craig are married. Craig brings his bride to meet his father, but John refuses to see her, imagining what type of woman his son would marry. Mary sets to win over the father, and takes a position as his secretary and completely captivates him. When he discovers that she is Craig's wife, he is overjoyed. It is then that Craig accidentally meets again Clara Marshall. With the lure of the gay life strong, he promises to attend her party the next night. Mary learns of the party and that her husband has lied to her about his whereabouts. When John threatens to go there and drag his son away, Mary says that it is her responsibility to get him. Dressed in the finest gown that John can buy, she goes to Clara's home. When Craig compares the two women face-to-face, his remorse is sincere as he appreciates the true value of the wife that he deceived.

Cast
Elaine Hammerstein as Mary Murdock
James A. Furey as Snowden
Webster Campbell as Craig Winchell
Marguerite Clayton as Clara Marshall
Frank Currier as John Winchell

References

External links

 
Coming attractions lantern slide at George Eastman House

1920 films
American silent feature films
Lost American films
1920 drama films
Silent American drama films
Films directed by George Archainbaud
American black-and-white films
Selznick Pictures films
1920 lost films
Lost drama films
1920s American films
1920s English-language films